"Joy" is a 1988 song by American singer Teddy Pendergrass. It written by Reggie Calloway, Vincent Calloway and Joel Davis. The single was Teddy Pendergrass' first number one on the Black Singles chart in ten years, where it stayed for two weeks. The single was also his first solo entry on the Hot 100 in seven years. "Joy" also peaked at number forty-two on the dance chart.

See also
List of number-one R&B singles of 1988 (U.S.)

References

1988 singles
1988 songs
Teddy Pendergrass songs
New jack swing songs
Songs written by Reggie Calloway